Portrait of a Young Man Holding a Letter is an oil-on-panel painting by Rosso Fiorentino, executed in 1518, now in the National Gallery, London. It is dated 22 June 1518 on the letter held by the unidentified young man in black hat and clothes.

In his Lives of the Artists Vasari briefly mentions that many portraits by Fiorentino could still be seen in Florentine homes, probably produced before Rosso left for Volterra in 1521 – this work is thought to be one of them.

References

Bibliography (in Italian)
Elisabetta Marchetti Letta, Pontormo, Rosso Fiorentino, Scala, Firenze 1994. 
Antonio Natali, Rosso Fiorentino, Silvana Editore, Milano 2006. 

Young Man
1518 paintings
Young Man
Collections of the National Gallery, London